Outland is a platform game developed by Housemarque and published by Ubisoft. The game combines two-dimensional platforming with a polarity system similar to Treasure's Ikaruga and Silhouette Mirage. Outland was released on April 27, 2011 for Xbox 360. The PlayStation 3 version, which was supposed to be released the day before, was delayed because of the 2011 PlayStation Network outage then later released in June 2011. A Microsoft Windows version was released on September 29, 2014, followed by the Mac OS X version on December 21 of the same year, and the Linux version on February 25, 2015.  The game was removed from sale on Steam and the Humble Store in December 2018 but has since been added back to Steam.

Gameplay 
Outland is a 2D platformer with action game elements. Gameplay mainly revolves around using Light (blue) and Dark (red) energies, which allows the player to pass through their respective barriers, and attack monsters born of the opposite alignment (e.g. use Light to attack Dark monsters).

Along the way, players learn special powers from large shrines, from simple melee attacks to the harnessing of Light and Dark energy. Players can also collect hidden objects called "Masks of the Gods" in order to unlock extras such as concept art or enhanced in-game abilities.

Players also have an option to experience the entire storyline online with a friend in co-operative mode. There are also co-op challenges scattered throughout the world that can be unlocked and played when in co-op mode.

In addition to the main storyline, there is an Arcade Mode that puts the player to the test by putting a set time for the player to traverse throughout an entire region and defeat its protector. For example, in the Jungle's Arcade Mode, the player has 15 minutes to travel throughout the entire Jungle and defeat the Golem in the end. The highest scores are posted online on a leaderboard. Flipping a switch, pausing the game, and dying halt the timer. Arcade scores increase with multipliers that drop from enemies, and a bonus is given depending on how much time is left after the protector is defeated. An Arcade chapter for one area is unlocked as soon as the area itself is unlocked.

Plot 
In the present day, one man had started to experience dreams and visions of the past. He attempted to take medicine to stop it, thinking that this was a medical problem, but the medicine was ineffective; something larger was at play here. The man decided to find a shaman to find out what the problem was, what these dreams and visions meant, and to cure him of them. However, the shaman told the man of the ancient stories of a battle 30,000 years ago between a great hero and the two Sisters of Chaos - one who controls Light from the Sun, and one who controls Darkness from the Moon. The Sisters were imprisoned after the battle, but the hero had perished in the process. The shaman informed the man that he was the hero's reincarnation, and that the Sisters of Chaos have apparently escaped their imprisonment. This man was now the only one who could stop them, and so he went forth on the journey.

First, the man runs into the Crossroads of the World, which connects to multiple areas. When he arrives, however, he experiences yet another, and the last, vision of the past in the middle of a large shrine. This is perhaps the most vivid of the visions, because even the player gets a chance to control the hero from 30,000 years ago as he makes his way through the destruction of the world to defeat the Sisters. However, the fight itself is not shown, as the vision is terminated at the very moment the fight began, while the narrator tells the result.

There are four protectors in the world, one per area, but they have been corrupted by Chaos and are now her minions. Due to this, the man must defeat these protectors as well. There are also many different species of creatures throughout the world, born from Light, Dark, or neutral energies, attempting to block the man's path, assisting the protectors and Chaos.

When all four protectors are defeated and four of the five runes activated, the shrine teleports the man to the Temple of Eternity.

The Temple of Eternity is where the Sisters were imprisoned in the battle 30,000 years ago, waiting all this time for their chance to escape and "uncreate" the world. The man must travel throughout the Temple of Eternity, finally ending his journey at one section named the Trail of Tears. Just past the Trail of Tears is a giant ladder, identical to the one the ancient hero had used to fight the Sisters. So the man climbs up the ladder and fights the Sisters in one last battle to save the world.

After winning the battle, the man is ready to deal the final blow and end the Sisters' lives, when suddenly, the Temple of Eternity collapses. The Sisters have never actually seen the world, only knowing that they wanted to destroy it and make it their own. But now, after they see the beauty and tranquility that both time and mankind had created, the Sisters humbly surrender to the man and retreat back to where they belong; one Sister to the Sun, one to the Moon. The spirit of the ancient hero from all those years ago then escapes from the man's body, as both the spirit's and the man's work are complete.

Reception 

The game received "favorable" reviews on all platforms according to the review aggregation website Metacritic.

Tom McShea of GameSpot called the game an "expertly crafted platformer." The reviewer praised the game's visual style, music, and co-op. IGN also called it "a hell of a game, and you should play it posthaste."

The Escapist gave the Xbox 360 version a score of four stars out of five and said that it "will put your skills to the test, but strikes a pleasant balance between frustration and triumph. It's not the easiest game in the world, but the effort it takes to master is well worth it." The Daily Telegraph similarly gave it a score of eight out of ten and called it "a game which is fun to play simply for the joy of playing, and when you throw in the ability to play through the story with a second person, along with some additional challenge areas designed exclusively for co-op play, Outland is [a] highly appealing, highly enjoyable downloadable title." The A.V. Club gave it a B and stated, "Boss battles are another highlight, a great example being a robed figure who can unpredictably cause colored rubble to come whizzing by from any direction." Wired gave the PlayStation 3 version a score of eight stars out of ten in its early review and called it "a tumultuous blend of Prince of Persia-style jumping action and the "bullet hell" of insane shooters like Ikaruga. It's complex, difficult and a lot of fun."

Outland was awarded as "Best PSN Game of 2011" by IGN and "Best Download-only Console Game 2011" by GameSpot.

References

External links 
 
 

2011 video games
Linux games
MacOS games
Multiplayer and single-player video games
Platform games
PlayStation 3 games
PlayStation Network games
Side-scrolling video games
Ubisoft games
Video games developed in Finland
Video games scored by Ari Pulkkinen
Video games with 2.5D graphics
Windows games
Xbox 360 Live Arcade games
Metroidvania games
Housemarque games